Syllepte leucodontia is a moth in the family Crambidae. It is found in Indonesia (Sulawesi, Ambon Island), Papua New Guinea and Australia, where it has been recorded from Queensland.

Adults are fuscous with a slight purplish gloss, the forewings have an indistinct dark antemedial line bent outwards to the inner margin. There are large dark orbicular and reniform spots in the cell, situated on a pale streak. The postmedial line is curved from the costa to vein 2 and defined by whitish. The hindwings have a dark discoidal spot on a pale ground. The postmedial line is white.

References

Moths described in 1898
leucodontia
Moths of Indonesia
Moths of Oceania